Matthew "Matt" Alan Chapman (born November 1, 1976) and Michael "Mike" Raymond Chapman (born September 20, 1973), known collectively as The Brothers Chaps, are American writers, voice actors, directors, animators, producers and composers. They are best known as the creators of the animated series Homestar Runner.

Early life
While Matt and Mike Chapman were born in Indiana, they grew up in Decatur, Georgia and later resided in Atlanta. Growing up in the 1980s, the Brothers Chaps were creating comic books, filming Super 8 movies and eventually toying with a video camera. 

Mike attended the University of Georgia and studied photography while Matt went to film school.

Career
Mike Chapman created the character of Homestar Runner in 1996 with friend Craig Zobel. The character debuted in the children's book The Homestar Runner Enters the Strongest Man in the World Contest, which was subsequently posted online as a series of images. In 2000, the Brothers Chaps began to create cartoons with the character using Adobe Flash. As the series progressed, more characters were added to the series and spin-off series were created, notably Strong Bad Emails in 2001. During production of Homestar Runner, Matt has been the primary voice actor for the titular character as well as characters like Strong Bad. Mike has been responsible for much of the animation, as well as the technical aspects of the Homestar Runner site. Both brothers contributed to the writing and direction of the series.

For a time, Matt Chapman worked as a writer and director for the children's television series Yo Gabba Gabba!. He also worked for the Disney Channel animated series Gravity Falls and The Hub live-action series The Aquabats! Super Show!, where he also contributed occasional voice work and supporting acting roles. Matt wrote the Wander Over Yonder episodes "The Bounty" and "The Timebomb" in collaboration with the show's writing staff. Matt also appeared in the second-season finale of Camp Camp, an animated series by Rooster Teeth, as the voice of Neil's father, Carl.

Mike also provides intentionally poor imitations of his brother's voice work for the Powered by The Cheat cartoon series on the Homestar Runner website. In addition, he has served as a writer for Yo Gabba Gabba!, and — like his brother Matt — has collaborated with the Wander Over Yonder staff, credited for writing the episode "The Liar".

The brothers had a general development deal with Disney Television Animation, and developed a series of short animations for Disney XD titled Two More Eggs which ran from 2015 to 2017. They have directed several music videos, including "Heimdalsgate Like a Promethean Curse" by Of Montreal, "Experimental Film" (featuring the Homestar Runner characters, most notably Strong Sad) and "Figure Eight" by They Might Be Giants, "Brand of Skin" by Folk Implosion, and "LA Lindsay" by Y-O-U, the band who also collaborated with the brothers on Strong Bad Sings. In 2017, the duo along with Robert Schneider and James Husband formed the Air-sea Dolphin project, which had two split singles with Honey Radar and the fictional band Sloshy from the Homestar Runner universe.

Television credits

Matt Chapman
Yo Gabba Gabba! (2011, 2015)
The Aquabats! Super Show! (2012–2014)
Gravity Falls (2012–2016)
Wander Over Yonder (2014)
Mickey Mouse (2014)
Pickle and Peanut (2015–2016)
Two More Eggs (2015–2017)
Amphibia (2019-2022)
The Owl House (2020–present)

Mike Chapman
Yo Gabba Gabba! (2011, 2015)
Wander Over Yonder (2014)
Two More Eggs (2015-2017)

References

External links

 
 

Living people
Animators from Georgia (U.S. state)
American Internet celebrities
American animated film directors
American animated film producers
American comics artists
American male voice actors
Animation duos
Artists from Atlanta
Florida State University alumni
Flash artists
Animators from Indiana
Sibling duos
University of Georgia alumni
Dunwoody High School alumni

Year of birth missing (living people)
Disney Television Animation people